Dąbrówki is a village in the administrative district of Gmina Czarna, within Łańcut County, Subcarpathian Voivodeship, in south-eastern Poland. The village has a population of 1,500.

References

Villages in Łańcut County